Esplanade Park is a public reserve in Fremantle, Western Australia.   Situated on Marine Terrace and opposite the Esplanade Hotel, the reserve features about 100 mature Norfolk Island pines (araucaria heterophylla) and the Explorers' Monument.

The park has also been called Fremantle Esplanade as well as Fremantle Oval.  The latter conflicts with the current name of nearby Fremantle Oval which was previously known as "Barracks Green Field".  The park known as "Fremantle Park" is located between Ord and Ellen Streets, Fremantle.

History
Prior to the founding of the Swan River Colony, the southern Fremantle foreshore approximately followed the line of where Marine Terrace (previously called Fitzgerald Terrace) is today.  In 1831, two years after settlement, Henry Reveley built a stone jetty nearby, possibly from Anglesea Point near Bathers Beach.  A second jetty (South Jetty) was built in 1854 on the same site. Winter storms continued to cause damage to the foreshore buildings and a sea wall was built by convicts (c.1880) which partly alleviated the problem, but encroachment from the sea and sand drift persisted. In 1873 the kilometre-long Long Jetty was built nearby, extending from Anglesea Point.

In 1902 more land was reclaimed from the sea and the Esplanade was created thanks to funds provided by the state government and the resumption of an area of private land owned by J. Briggs M.L.C.  A bandstand was opened in 1906.  The first Norfolk Island Pines were planted in 1908.

Activities

Concerts and performances
The popular Fremantle Sardine Festival is staged on the park each January.

Transportation

Public transport
The former The Esplanade railway station is to the west of the Esplanade on the far side of the Fremantle railway line, between the park and Little Creatures Brewery.

References

Parks in Perth, Western Australia
Marine Terrace, Fremantle